Transversotrema damsella is a species of parasitic flatworms found in pomacentrids, labrids and mugilids on Lizard Island.

References

Further reading
Cribb, Thomas H., et al. "Biogeography of tropical Indo-West Pacific parasites: A cryptic species of Transversotrema and evidence for rarity of Transversotrematidae (Trematoda) in French Polynesia." Parasitology international 63.2 (2014): 285–294.
Sun, Derek, et al. "Pseudobacciger cheneyae n. sp.(Digenea: Gymnophalloidea) from Weber's chromis (Chromis weberi Fowler & Bean)(Perciformes: Pomacentridae) at Lizard Island, Great Barrier Reef, Australia."Systematic parasitology 88.2 (2014): 141–152.

External links

Plagiorchiida
Parasitic helminths of fish